Valdis Birkavs (born July 28, 1942) is a Latvian politician. He was born in Riga. Birkavs attended the University of Latvia, where he studied philosophy, sociology, law, psychology and mathematical logic. He was first elected to the Latvian parliament in 1990 and helped to found the Latvian Way party. After Latvian Way won the 1993 parliamentary election, Birkavs became the prime minister, leading a coalition government of Latvian Way and the Latvian Farmers' Union. He resigned after the Farmer's Union left the government in the summer of 1994. He then became the deputy prime minister and foreign minister in the next government. He remained the foreign minister for five years under four different prime ministers, eventually resigning in 1999. In the presidential elections of 1999 (Latvia's president is chosen by the Parliament), he was nominated as a candidate and received second place. He was then appointed as minister of justice, and served in that position until 2000.

Birkavs is a member of the Club of Madrid, an independent non-profit organization composed of 81 democratic former Presidents and Prime Ministers from 57 different countries.

See also
 Birkavs cabinet

References

1942 births
Living people
Politicians from Riga
Latvian Way politicians
Prime Ministers of Latvia
Ministers of Justice of Latvia
Ministers of Foreign Affairs of Latvia
Deputies of the Supreme Council of the Republic of Latvia
Deputies of the 5th Saeima
Deputies of the 6th Saeima
Deputies of the 7th Saeima
Criminologists
Latvian legal scholars
University of Latvia alumni